The Peccot Lecture (Cours Peccot in French) is a semester-long mathematics course given at the Collège de France. Each course is given by a mathematician under 30 years old who has distinguished themselves by their promising work. The course consists in a series of conferences during which the laureate exposes their recent research works.

Being a Peccot lecturer is a distinction that often foresees an exceptional scientific career. Several future recipients of the Fields Medal, Abel Prize, members of the French Academy of Sciences, and professors at the Collège de France are among the laureates. Some of the most illustrious recipients include Émile Borel and the Fields medalists Laurent Schwartz, Jean-Pierre Serre, or Alain Connes.

Some Peccot lectures may additionally be granted – exceptionally and irregularly – the Peccot prize or the Peccot–Vimont prize.

History 
The Peccot lectures are among several manifestations organized at the Collège de France which are funded and managed by bequests from the family of Claude-Antoine Peccot, a young mathematician who died while aged 20. Several successive donations to the foundation (in 1886, 1894, and 1897) by Julie Anne Antoinette Peccot and Claudine Henriette Marguerite Lafond (widow Vimont) – respectively the mother and the godmother of Claude-Antoine Peccot – first allowed to create annual stipend, followed by annual lectureship appointments, awarded to mathematicians under 30 who have proved promising. Since 1918, the Peccot lectures have been enlarged to two or three mathematicians each year.

Laureates

Laureates of the Peccot lecture and prize who subsequently obtained the Fields medal 

 Laurent Schwartz: Peccot lecture and prize 1945–1946, Fields medal 1950
 Jean-Pierre Serre: Peccot lecture and prize 1954–1955, Fields medal 1954
 Alexandre Grothendieck: Peccot lecture 1957–1958, Fields medal 1966
 Pierre Deligne: Peccot lecture 1971–1972, Fields medal 1978
 Alain Connes: Peccot lecture and prize 1975–76, Fields medal 1982
 Pierre-Louis Lions: Peccot lecture 1983–1984, Fields medal 1994
 Jean-Christophe Yoccoz: Peccot lecture 1987–1988, Fields medal 1994
 Laurent Lafforgue: Peccot lecture and prize 1995–1996, Fields medal 2002
 Wendelin Werner: Peccot lecture 1998–1999, Fields medal 2006
 Cédric Villani: Peccot lecture and prize 2002–2003, Fields medal 2010
 Artur Avila: Peccot lecture 2004–2005, Fields medal 2014
 Alessio Figalli: Peccot lecture 2011–2012, Fields medal 2018
 Peter Scholze: Peccot lecture and prize 2012–2013, Fields medal 2018
 Hugo Duminil-Copin: Peccot lecture 2014–2015, Fields medal 2022

All Peccot lectures

See also

 List of mathematics awards

References 

Collège de France
Awards with age limits
Early career awards
Mathematics awards